Joseph Charles André Hinse (born April 19, 1945) is a Canadian retired professional ice hockey player who played four games in the National Hockey League and 256 games in the World Hockey Association between 1968 and 1977. He played for the Toronto Maple Leafs, Phoenix Roadrunners and Houston Aeros.

Career statistics

Regular season and playoffs

External links
 

1945 births
Living people
Canadian expatriate ice hockey players in the United States
Canadian ice hockey left wingers
Charlotte Checkers (EHL) players
Houston Aeros (WHA) players
Ice hockey people from Quebec
Phoenix Roadrunners (WHA) players
Phoenix Roadrunners (WHL) players
Sportspeople from Trois-Rivières
Toronto Maple Leafs players
Tulsa Oilers (1964–1984) players